The Fred Ward Memorial Show was an annual professional wrestling memorial event produced by the Georgia Championship Wrestling (GCW) promotion, which was held from 2004 to 2009. The show was held in honor of Fred Ward, a pioneering wrestling promoter who controlled the central Georgia wrestling territory for over 30 years, who died on May 7, 1992. It was originally held in Columbus, Georgia by GCW until Jerry Oates' retirement in 2006, whereupon the new owners Bill and Diane Hewes relocated the promotion, renamed Great Championship Wrestling, to Phenix City, Alabama. Its third annual memorial show, the last show held at the GCW Arena, "drew the biggest crowd [at the venue] in over a year".

Many of the featured wrestlers were former stars in World Championship Wrestling or were then competing in Total Nonstop Action Wrestling as well as local stars such as Jason Cross, Damian Steele, Vordell Walker, and David Young. Older regional stars from the Georgia territory, many of whom had worked for Fred Ward, also made guest appearances. The first Ward tribute show in 2004 saw masked wrestler The Wrestler defeat GCW United States Junior Heavyweight Champion Vordell Walker and an 8-man single-elimination tournament in which the winner, Jason Cross, received an award from Mr. Wrestling II. Ole Anderson, Bill Dromo, Thunderbolt Patterson, Les Thatcher, Masked Superstar, The Oates Brothers (Jerry and Ted Oates), and Brad and "Bullet" Bob Armstrong were seen in later shows.

Show results

First Annual Fred Ward Tribute Show (2004)
August 10, 2004 in Columbus, Georgia (GCW Arena)

Tournament brackets
This was a one-night tournament which took place on August 10, 2004. The tournament brackets were:

Second Annual Fred Ward Memorial Show (2005)
August 6, 2005 in Columbus, Georgia (GCW Arena)

Third Annual Fred Ward Memorial Show (2006)
September 23, 2006 in Columbus, Georgia (GCW Arena)

Fourth Annual Fred Ward Memorial Show (2007)
September 29, 2007 in Phenix City, Alabama (GR8 SK8 Plex)

Fifth Annual Fred Ward Memorial Show (2008)
September 4, 2008 in Phenix City, Alabama (GR8 SK8 Plex)

Sixth Annual Fred Ward Memorial Show (2009)
September 17, 2009 in Phenix City, Alabama (GR8 SK8 Plex)

References

Professional wrestling memorial shows
Professional wrestling in Alabama
Professional wrestling in Georgia (U.S. state)